Julie Dicko Erichsen (born 15 August 2001) is a Norwegian artistic gymnast. She competed at the 2020 Olympic Games and the 2019 World Championships. She was the first Norwegian female gymnast to qualify for the Olympic Games since 1992.

Personal life 
Julie Erichsen was born on 15 August 2001, in Bergen. She was born to a Malian father and Norwegian mother. Her mother, Kari Erichsen, was also a gymnast and a Norwegian national champion. She began gymnastics when she was nine years old. She trains in Bergen for around 25 hours each week.

Career 
Erichsen competed at the junior level of the 2016 European Championships with Sara Davidsen, Edel Fosse, Julie Soederstroem, and Juliane Toessebro, and the team finished 16th. She made her senior international debut at the 2017 Northern European Championships alongside Ingrid Hafenbrädl, Julie Madsø, Thea Nygaard, and Martine Skregelid where they won the team gold medal.

She competed at the 2018 European Championships with Sara Davidsen, Edel Fosse, Thea Nygaard, and Julie Soederstroem, and they finished 21st in the team qualification round. At the Norwegian Championships, Erichsen finished 4th in the all-around and won the gold medal on vault and the silver medal on uneven bars. She competed at the FIG World Cup in Paris, but she did not qualify for any event finals. She competed at the 2018 World Championships with Davidsen, Fosse, Nygaard, and Soederstroem, and they finished 34th in the team qualification round which meant they did not qualify as a team for the 2019 World Championships. Her final competition of the 2018 season was the 2018 Voronin Cup in Moscow where she won the bronze medal on vault behind Yeo Seo-jeong and Elina Vihrova.

Her first international event of the 2019 season was the FIG World Cup in Osijek where she finished 8th in the vault final. At the Norwegian Championships, she defended her vault title, and she finished 4th on the balance beam and 5th in the floor exercise. She competed at the World Cup in Paris where she finished 5th in the vault event final. At the 2019 World Championships she finished 83rd in the all-around with a score of 48.599. She qualified for an individual spot at the 2020 Olympic Games, becoming the first Norwegian female gymnast to do so since Anita Tomulevski in 1992.

References

External links 
 
 
 
 

2001 births
Living people
Sportspeople from Bergen
Norwegian female artistic gymnasts
Gymnasts at the 2020 Summer Olympics
Olympic gymnasts of Norway
Norwegian people of Malian descent
21st-century Norwegian women